Charles O. Rossotti (born January 17, 1941) is an American businessman, and former Commissioner of Internal Revenue.

Early career
Rossotti was born in 1941 in New York City and graduated from St. Cecilia High School in Englewood, New Jersey in 1958, before earning a Bachelor of Arts degree in economics from Georgetown University (1962) and an MBA from Harvard Business School (1964). Rossotti was the first ever MBA hire for the Boston Consulting Group. But after only a year, Rossotti went to work for the Office of the Secretary of Defense. From 1965 to 1969, Rossotti worked for Robert McNamara, becoming Deputy Assistant Secretary of Defense for Systems Analysis at age 29.

In 1970, Rossotti and several DOD colleagues co-founded American Management Systems, a technology and management consulting firm. Rossotti served as Chief Executive Officer from the late 1980s to the mid-1990s.

Rossotti also sits on the Atlantic Council's Board of Directors.

IRS years
In 1997, Rossotti was named Commissioner of Internal Revenue by then President Bill Clinton where he served for 5 years.

He was considered a reformer, upgrading the agency's technology, as well as turning the IRS into a more customer service-oriented agency.  Rossotti received a waiver from the Clinton administration that allowed him to retain his AMS stock in a blind trust.

After leaving the IRS, Rossotti joined The Carlyle Group, a global private equity firm in Washington, D.C., as a Senior Advisor.

Publications
Rossotti is the author of two books:
 Modernizing America's Tax Agency (2000)
 Many Unhappy Returns: One Man's Quest To Turn Around The Most Unpopular Organization In America (Leadership for the Common Good) (Cambridge: Harvard Business School Press, 2005)

In addition, he provided a foreword to Al Gore's Reinventing Service At The IRS: Report Of The Customer Service Task Force National Performance Review (1997).  He has also authored government publications and contributed to other works, including a proposal published in Tax Notes Federal to reduce the tax gap in the United States.

References

https://purespiceplus.com/irs.html

External links

https://purespiceplus.com/irs.html

1941 births
Businesspeople from New York City
The Carlyle Group people
Clinton administration personnel
Commissioners of Internal Revenue
Directors of Bank of America
Georgetown University alumni
Harvard Business School alumni
Living people
St. Cecilia High School (New Jersey) alumni
United States Department of Defense officials